The Impact X Division Championship is a professional wrestling championship created and promoted by Impact Wrestling. It debuted on June 19, 2002, at the taping of then-TNA's second weekly pay-per-view (PPV) event.  The current champion is Trey Miguel, who is in his second reign. 

Like most professional wrestling championships, the title is won as a result of a predetermined match. There have been 101 reigns among 50 wrestlers.

History

X Division

The TNA X Division was established on June 19, 2002 at Total Nonstop Action's first weekly PPV event with a Six Man Tag Team match resulting in Jimmy Yang, Jorge Estrada, and Sonny Siaki—collectively known as The Flying Elvises—defeating A.J. Styles, Jerry Lynn, and Low Ki. Later that day at the taping of the next weekly PPV event, TNA introduced the X Division Championship—then known as the X Championship—to showcase the division more prominently. The division is described as wrestling reinvented, as it takes traditional wrestling and mixes it with the fast-paced, high–risk style of wrestling incorporated in cruiserweight divisions and lucha libre. The division was until 2011 promoted under the motto "It is not about weight limits, it is about no limits" by commentator Mike Tenay. Following Hulk Hogan becoming the new on-screen General Manager in March 2012, the weight limit was ignored on June 10, 2012, at Slammiversary when the  Samoa Joe was allowed to challenge for the belt. In October 2012, the weight limit was officially repealed when  Rob Van Dam challenged for, and eventually won, the title at Bound for Glory. In March 2013, the X Division was given a new set of rules, which meant all matches were wrestled in Triple Threat format, and a new weight limit of 230 lbs. This proved to be extremely unpopular with fans, and the rules and weight limit were repealed once again in August of that year.

Speciality matches

The Total Nonstop Action X Division has multiple styles of match types used to showcase the talent within the division and to defend the TNA X Division Championship in more marketable matches. Three of the matches used in TNA are the Ultimate X match, The Steel Asylum, and the Xscape match.

 The Ultimate X match was introduced in 2003. It involves multiple competitors racing to retrieve the X Division Championship or a giant red letter "X", which is suspended above the ring by two cables. The cables are attached to posts that stand behind the turnbuckles of the ring. These cables intertwine to form an "X" over the center of the ring. This match has become successful in TNA; it was featured in the 2008 DVD "TNA: Ultimate Matches", released by TNA Home Video.
 The Steel Asylum made its debut in May 2008 at TNA's Sacrifice PPV event, under the name "The TerrorDome". It was used once again in October 2008 at their Bound for Glory IV PPV event, under the new and current moniker "The Steel Asylum". The layout of the match involves the ring being surrounded by a giant red steel barred cage with a domed ceiling. The only way to achieve victory is to escape the cage through a hole in the center of the ceiling.
 The Xscape match is the third specialty match primarily used in TNA. It is held annually at TNA's Lockdown PPV event in April—an all–steel cage format PPV event. The first two Xscape matches were held to determine the number one contender to the TNA X Division Championship, while, since 2007, it has been contested for the X Division Championship. The contest involves four to six participants. To win this match, two or more participants—depending on how many are involved in the encounter—must be eliminated by pinfall or submission leaving only two participants. These two men then race to see who escapes the cage first to claim victory.

Creation
The championship was created and debuted before the main event at the taping of TNA's second weekly PPV event on June 19, 2002; the event aired on June 26, 2002. Later, A.J. Styles defeated Low Ki, Jerry Lynn, and Psicosis in a Four Way Double Elimination match to be crowned the inaugural champion; this match was announced as being for the NWA X Championship on the onscreen graphic while the ring announcer stated it was for the "NWA–TNA X Championship". Afterwards, the title was renamed the NWA–TNA X Division Championship and then shortened to just the TNA X Division Championship. It is the oldest title in Impact Wrestling.

Option C
Option C is a concept in which the current X Division Champion may voluntarily vacate the championship in exchange for a World Heavyweight Championship match. It began in June 2012 when then-champion Austin Aries said that he was not satisfied with being just the X Division Champion, which led to then-General Manager Hulk Hogan offering him a match for the World Heavyweight Championship, but only if he first vacated the X Division Championship. Aries agreed to Hogan's terms, on the condition that future X Division Champions be given the same opportunity.

Cash-in matches

Championship Tournaments

TNA X Division Championship Tournament (2009)
The tournament was the result of a match for the TNA X Division Championship at Final Resolution between Eric Young and Sheik Abdul Bashir ending in a controversial fashion, with Young winning the championship thanks to the referee's help. Management Director Jim Cornette stripped Young of the belt and announced the tournament to crown the new champion. The tournament final took place at Genesis.

TNA X Division Championship Tournament (2012)
On the June 28, 2012, episode of Impact Wrestling, TNA announced a tournament for the TNA X Division Championship, which would take place at Destination X, where Austin Aries would vacate the title for a shot at the TNA World Heavyweight Championship. The tournament was preceded by four qualifying matches featuring wrestlers from the independent circuit. TNA contracted wrestlers Douglas Williams, Kid Kash and Zema Ion were given automatic spots in the first round of the tournament. The eighth and final spot in the tournament would be filled by the winner of a four-way between the losers of the qualifying matches. At Destination X the eight wrestlers will face each other in four singles matches, with the winners advancing to an Ultimate X match for the X Division Championship.

TNA X Division Championship Tournament (2013)
On the Destination X edition of Impact! TNA started a tournament to determine a new TNA X Division Champion, since the title was vacated after Chris Sabin traded it in for a shot at the World Championship. The tournament consisted of three three–way semifinal matches, taking place on the July 18 edition of Impact!, with the finals, another three-way match, taking place on July 25, 2013.

TNA X Division Championship Tournament (2014)
On the Destination X edition of Impact! TNA started a tournament to determine a new TNA X Division Champion, since the title was vacated after Austin Aries traded it in for a shot at the World Championship. The tournament consisted of three three–way semifinal matches, taking place on the July 31 edition of Impact!, with the finals, another three-way match, taking place on August 7, 2014.

TNA X Division Championship Tournament (2015)
On the Destination X 2015 edition of Impact! TNA started a tournament to determine a new TNA X Division Champion, since the title was vacated after Rockstar Spud traded it in for a shot at the World Championship. The tournament consisted of three three–way semifinal matches, taking place on the June 10th edition of Impact!, with the finals, another three-way match, taking place on June 27, 2015.

Impact X Division Championship Tournament (2021) 
On the September 23 episode of Impact!, Impact started a tournament to determine the new Impact X Division Champion, since the title was vacated after Josh Alexander invoked Option C to challenge for the Impact World Championship. The tournament consist of three three–way semi-final matches, with the finals, another three-way match, will taking place at Bound for Glory.

Impact X Division Championship Tournament (2022)
On October 20, 2022, after Frankie Kazarian vacated the Impact X Division Championship for a shot at the Impact World Championship it was announced that there will be an eight-man tournament to determine who will be the new Impact X Division Champion on November 18, 2022, at Impact Pay-per-view Over Drive.

Unifications and outside defenses

In July 2002, the X Division Champion AJ Styles defended the title against Adam Jacobs and David Young at Ring of Honor's Crowning a Champion, the first defense outside TNA.
In May 2003, before the professional wrestling promotion World Wrestling All-Stars' (WWA) foreclosure, then NWA–TNA X Division champion Chris Sabin defeated WWA International Cruiserweight Champion Jerry Lynn, Frankie Kazarian, and Johnny Swinger in a Four Corners championship unification match to unify the X Division Championship with the WWA International Cruiserweight Championship. In Winter 2004, Petey Williams defended the title in various IWA-Mid South events.

During Christopher Daniels' first reign in mid-2005, he defended the X Division Championship at several Pro Wrestling Guerrilla shows. The first defense happened at All Star Weekend - Night One on April 1 against Alex Shelley, while the second occurred at All Star Weekend – Night Two on April 2 against Chris Hero; Daniels won both encounters retaining the championship. At Jason Takes PWG on May 13, Daniels fought A.J. Styles for the X Division Championship and Styles' PWG Championship to a one-hour time-limit draw. Daniels successfully defended the X Division Title two more times in PWG; once at Guitarmageddon on June 11 against El Generico, while once at The 2nd Annual PWG Bicentennial Birthday Extravaganza - Night One on July 9 against fellow TNA wrestler Chris Sabin. In September 2005 at TNA's Unbreakable PPV event, the TNA X Division Championship was defended in the main event for the first time at a monthly PPV event; then-champion Christopher Daniels defended the championship against A.J. Styles and Samoa Joe.

The title was once again defended in the main event of a monthly event at TNA's August 2007 Hard Justice PPV event, where Kurt Angle defeated Samoa Joe to win the TNA X Division and the TNA World Tag Team Championship and retain the TNA World Heavyweight and IGF's version of the IWGP World Heavyweight Championship. This win made Angle the only in the history of TNA to hold every active championship at the same time; TNA World, X Division, and World Tag Team.

On March 4, 2014, The title was defended in Japan as part of Kaisen: Outbreak - a supershow event promoted by Wrestle-1 in partnership with TNA - where the title was won by Wrestle-1 star Seiya Sanada.  On March 22, Sanada defended and retained the title on a Wrestle-1 show.

Five Women have unsuccessfully challenged for the X Division Title during its 20-year history. Athena (became the first female challenger on January 22, 2003), Trinity (March 19, 2003), Tessa Blanchard (October 20, 2019, and February 9, 2020), Jordynne Grace (October 20, 2020, and April 1, 2022), and Billie Starkz (October 4, 2022, during Pro Wrestler Revolver).

Belt designs
In May 2007, the National Wrestling Alliance (NWA) ended their five-year partnership with TNA, which allowed the NWA to regain control over the NWA World Heavyweight and World Tag Team Championships that TNA had controlled since June 2002. TNA then introduced a new TNA X Division Championship belt on the May 16, 2007 edition of TNA's online podcast TNA Today. Jeremy Borash and Management Director Jim Cornette, TNA's on-screen authority figure at the time, unveiled the new belt and awarded it to then-champion Chris Sabin.

On July 19, 2013, former TNA President Dixie Carter unveiled a new design for the championship, with blue accents to match the color scheme of the company.

On June 16, 2015, TNA tweaked the title's design by recoloring its accents from blue to green.

On August 18, 2017, the X Division Championship design was given a complete overhaul to reflect TNA's transfer to the Global Force Wrestling moniker.

On October 26, 2017, Trevor Lee was seen in a taped segment on Impact! with a new version of the title belt branded for Impact Wrestling.

In 2020, Impact Wrestling redesigned the belt, putting a big red "X" on the center plate (a nod to the original belt), and made red the dominant color.

Reigns

The inaugural champion was A.J. Styles, who won the championship by defeating Low Ki, Jerry Lynn, and Psicosis in a Four Way Double Elimination match on June 19, 2002 at TNA's second weekly PPV event. At 301 days, Austin Aries' first reign holds the record for longest in the title's history. At less than one day, Eric Young's only reign, and Chris Sabin's sixth reign and Rockstar Spud's second reign are the shortest in the title's history. Chris Sabin holds the record for most reigns with eight.

Trey Miguel is the current champion in his second reign. He defeated Black Taurus on November 18, 2022 at Over Drive in Louisville, Kentucky to win the vacant title.

See also
X Division

References

Notes

External links
Impact Wrestling X-Division Championship at Cagematch.net

Impact Wrestling championships
X Division championships